Liberty Hall is a 1914 British silent comedy film directed by Harold M. Shaw and starring Ben Webster, Edna Flugrath and O. B. Clarence. It is an adaptation of the 1892 play of the same title by R. C. Carton.

Cast
 Ben Webster as Sir Hartley Chilworth  
 Edna Flugrath as Ann Chilworth  
 O. B. Clarence as Todman Crafer  
 Ranee Brooks as Blanche Chilworth  
 Douglas Munro as Briginshaw  
 Langhorn Burton as Gerald Haringay  
 Gwynne Herbert as Mrs. Crafer  
 Hubert Willis as Pedrick

References

Bibliography
 Goble, Alan. The Complete Index to Literary Sources in Film. Walter de Gruyter, 1999.

External links
 

1914 films
1914 comedy films
British silent feature films
British comedy films
British films based on plays
Films directed by Harold M. Shaw
Films set in England
British black-and-white films
1910s English-language films
1910s British films
Silent comedy films